Sofya Albertovna Ochigava (born 7 July 1987) is a Russian female professional boxer. As an amateur, she competed for Russia in the lightweight category (under 60 kg) at the 2012 AIBA Women's World Boxing Championships and the 2012 Summer Olympics. She went head to head with Irish boxer Katie Taylor in the title match on both occasions, with Taylor emerging victorious both times. She was also three times European champion (2005, 2007, 2009), and twice World champion (2005, 2006). In 2008, she won the bronze medal of the World championship.

Ochigava was born in the city of Odintsovo, Moscow Oblast, Soviet Union, where she is still a resident. She has Georgian origin. She started to train in kickboxing, but eventually moved to amateur boxing. She made a professional debut in 2016. There, she defeated Firuza Sharipova by a unanimous decision. A rematch with Sharipova was scheduled for 3 April 2021 at the Pyramide in Kazan, Russia, but due to lack of funding, it was ultimately cancelled.

Professional boxing record

References

External links

1987 births
Living people
Boxers at the 2012 Summer Olympics
Olympic boxers of Russia
Russian women boxers
Olympic silver medalists for Russia
Olympic medalists in boxing
Medalists at the 2012 Summer Olympics
AIBA Women's World Boxing Championships medalists
Lightweight boxers
People from Odintsovo
Sportspeople from Moscow Oblast
Russian people of Georgian descent